The 2013 European Para-Dressage Championship, known for sponsorship reasons as the JYSK FEI European Para-Dressage Championship, was held between August 19 and August 25, 2013 in Herning, Denmark. It formed part of the 2013 FEI European Championships; other disciplines included were Showjumping and Dressage.

Competitions

General 

Competition was held in eleven events; the team event involved four horse per nation, while individuals competed across ten graded individual freestyle competitions; the five individual classes, where marks also counted towards team medals, and the freestyle classes.

Competition was dominated by riders from Great Britain, historically the leading nation in the sport. Sophie Christiansen, Sophie Wells and Natasha Baker each won three gold medals on their way to taking team gold for Great Britain. Austria's Pepo Puch won two gold medals in the Grade III classifications.

Medals

Medal table

External links 
 Official web page of the 2013 European Para Dressage Championship

References 

Dressage
Equestrian sports competitions in Denmark
Sport in Herning
International sports competitions hosted by Denmark
2013 in Danish sport
Parasports competitions